The 2021 Cincinnati Reds season was the 152nd season for the franchise in Major League Baseball, and their 19th at Great American Ball Park in Cincinnati.

The first to be broadcast on the rebranded Bally Sports Ohio, it would also be memorable as the first for a new PBP television broadcaster for the Reds, John Sadak.

Regular season

Standings

National League Central

National League Wildcard

Record vs. opponents

Game log

|-style="background:#fbb;"
| 1 || April 1 || Cardinals || 6–11 || Gallegos (1–0) || Castillo (0–1) || — || 12,695 || 0–1 || L1
|-style="background:#bfb;"
| 2 || April 3 || Cardinals || 9–6 || Mahle (1–0) || Wainwright (0–1) || — || 12,213 || 1–1 || W1
|-style="background:#bfb;"
| 3 || April 4 || Cardinals || 12–1 || Hoffman (1–0) || Martínez (0–1) || — || 11,629 || 2–1 || W2
|-style="background:#bfb;"
| 4 || April 5 || Pirates || 5–3 || Doolittle (1–0) || Howard (1–1) || Garrett (1) || 9,097 || 3–1 || W3
|-style="background:#bfb;"
| 5 || April 6 || Pirates || 14–1 || Miley (1–0) || Cahill (0–1) || — || 11,093 || 4–1 || W4
|-style="background:#bfb;"
| 6 || April 7 || Pirates || 11–4 || Castillo (1–1) || Kuhl (0–1) || — || 11,463 || 5–1 || W5
|-style="background:#bfb;"
| 7 || April 9 ||  @ Diamondbacks || 6–5  || Pérez (1–0) || Young (0–2) || Garrett (2) || 19,385 || 6–1 || W6
|-style="background:#fbb;"
| 8 || April 10 || @ Diamondbacks || 3–8 || Smith (1–0) || Hoffman (1–1) || — || 13,208 || 6–2 || L1
|-style="background:#fbb;"
| 9 || April 11 || @ Diamondbacks || 0–7 || Weaver (1–0) || De León (0–1) || — || 10,981 || 6–3 || L2
|-style="background:#bfb;"
| 10 || April 12 || @ Giants || 3–0 || Miley (2–0) || Sanchez (0–1) || Sims (1) || 3,662 || 7–3 || W1
|-style="background:#fbb;"
| 11 || April 13 || @ Giants || 6–7 || Peralta (2–0) || Pérez (1–1) || McGee (5) || 3,673 || 7–4 || L1
|-style="background:#fbb;"
| 12 || April 14 || @ Giants || 0–3 || Cueto (2–0) || Mahle (1–1) || McGee (6) || 6,409 || 7–5 || L2
|-style="background:#bfb;"
| 13 || April 16 || Indians || 10–3 || Hoffman (2–1) || Allen (1–2) || — || 12,497 || 8–5 || W1
|-style="background:#bfb;"
| 14 || April 17 || Indians || 3–2  || Doolittle (2–0) || Pérez (0–1) || — || 12,598 || 9–5 || W2
|-style="background:#fbb;"
| 15 || April 18 || Indians || 3–6 || Bieber (2–1) || Miley (2–1) || Clase (4) || 12,551 || 9–6 || L1
|-style="background:#bbb;" 
| — || April 20 || Diamondbacks || colspan=7| Suspended (Rain, continuation date: April 21)
|-style="background:#fbb;"
| 16 || April 21 || Diamondbacks || 4–5 || Bukauskas (1–0) || Garrett (0–1) || Crichton (2) || 8,085 || 9–7 || L2
|-style="background:#fbb;"
| 17 || April 21 || Diamondbacks || 5–8  || Clarke (1–0) || Pérez (1–2) || — || 8,025 || 9–8 || L3
|-style="background:#fbb;"
| 18 || April 22 || Diamondbacks || 11–14  || Smith (1–1) || Sims (0–1) || — || 7,549 || 9–9 || L4
|-style="background:#fbb;"
| 19 || April 23 || @ Cardinals || 4–5 || Kim (1–0) || Gray (0–1) || Reyes (4) || 13,196 || 9–10 || L5
|-style="background:#fbb;"
| 20 || April 24 || @ Cardinals || 0–2 || Gant (1–2) || Miley (2–2) || Gallegos (1) || 13,176 || 9–11 || L6
|-style="background:#fbb;" 
| 21 || April 25 || @ Cardinals || 2–5 || Flaherty (4–0) || Castillo (1–2) || Reyes (5) || 13,348 || 9–12 || L7
|-style="background:#bfb;"
| 22 || April 26 || @ Dodgers || 5–3  || Antone (1–0) || Jansen (0–1) || — || 15,199 || 10–12 || W1
|-style="background:#bfb;"
| 23 || April 27 || @ Dodgers || 6–5 || Hendrix (1–0) || Alexander (0–2) || Doolittle (1) || 15,306 || 11–12 || W2
|-style="background:#fbb;" 
| 24 || April 28 || @ Dodgers || 0–8 || Kershaw (4–2) || Gray (0–2) || — || 15,052 || 11–13 || L1
|-style="background:#bfb;" 
| 25 || April 30 || Cubs || 8–6 || Miley (3–2) || Arrieta (3–3) || Antone (1) || 16,090 || 12–13 || W1
|-

|-style="background:#fbb;" 
| 26 || May 1 || Cubs || 2–3 || Brothers (1–0) || Castillo (1–3) || Kimbrel (5) || 17,077 || 12–14 || L1
|-style="background:#bfb;" 
| 27 || May 2 || Cubs || 13–12  || Hendrix (2–0) || Kimbrel (0–1) || — || 16,755 || 13–14 || W1
|-style="background:#fbb;" 
| 28 || May 4 || White Sox || 0–9 || Cease (2–0) || Hoffman (2–2) || — || 10,209 || 13–15 || L1
|-style="background:#bfb;" 
| 29 || May 5 || White Sox || 1–0  ||  Sims (1–1) || Hendriks (1–1) || — || 10,247 || 14–15 || W1
|-style="background:#bfb;" 
| 30 || May 7 || @ Indians || 3–0 || Miley (4–2) || Clase (2–2) || — || 7,803 || 15–15 || W2
|-style="background:#fbb;" 
| 31 || May 8 || @ Indians || 2–9 || Civale (5–0) || Castillo (1–4) || — || 9,968 || 15–16 || L1
|-style="background:#bbb;" 
| — || May 9 || @ Indians || colspan=7 | Postponed (make-up date August 9)
|-style="background:#bfb;" 
| 32 || May 10 || @ Pirates || 14–1 || Mahle (2–1) || Keller (2–4) || — || 4,065 || 16–16 || W1
|-style="background:#fbb;" 
| 33 || May 11 || @ Pirates || 2–7 || Brubaker (3–2) || Hoffman (2–3) || — || 4,049 || 16–17 || L1
|-style="background:#bfb;" 
| 34 || May 12 || @ Pirates || 5–1  || Sims (2–1) || Underwood Jr. (1–2) || — || 4,515 || 17–17 || W1
|-style="background:#fbb;" 
| 35 || May 13 || @ Rockies || 8–13 || Gonzalez (2–1) || Castillo (1–5) || — || 13,647 || 17–18 || L1
|-style="background:#fbb;" 
| 36 || May 14 || @ Rockies || 6–9 || Márquez (2–4) || Miley (4–3) || Bard (4) || 20,232 || 17–19 || L2
|-style="background:#bfb;" 
| 37 || May 15 || @ Rockies || 6–5  || Sims (3–1) || Santos (0–1) || Hembree (1) || 20,136 || 18–19 || W1
|-style="background:#bfb;" 
| 38 || May 16 || @ Rockies || 7–6 || Doolittle (3–0) || Givens (1–2) || Antone (2) || 15,541 || 19–19 || W2
|-style="background:#fbb;" 
| 39 || May 17 || Giants || 3–6 || Webb (3–3) || Gray (0–3) || Rogers (5) || 11,004 || 19–20 || L1
|-style="background:#fbb;" 
| 40 || May 18 || Giants || 2–4 || DeSclafani (4–1) || Castillo (1–6) || McGee (11) || 8,745 || 19–21 || L2
|-style="background:#fbb;"
| 41 || May 19 || Giants || 0–4 || Gausman (4–0) || Miley (4–4) || — || 10,326 || 19–22 || L3
|-style="background:#fbb;" 
| 42 || May 20 || Giants || 4–19 || Cueto (3–1) || Mahle (2–2) || — || 11,656 || 19–23 || L4
|-style="background:#bfb;"
| 43 || May 21 || Brewers || 9–4 || Hoffman (3–3) || Houser (3–5) || — || 17,234 || 20–23 || W1
|-style="background:#fbb;" 
| 44 || May 22 || Brewers || 3–4 || Suter (3–2) || Hembree (0–1) || Hader (10) || 17,611 || 20–24 || L1
|-style="background:#fbb;" 
| 45 || May 23 || Brewers || 4–9 || Boxberger (1–1) || Castillo (1–7) || — || 16,171 || 20–25 || L2
|-style="background:#bfb;" 
| 46 || May 25 || @ Nationals || 2–1 || Mahle (3–2) || Scherzer (4–3) || Sims (2) || 8,935 || 21–25 || W1
|-style="background:#bbb;" 
| — || May 26 || @ Nationals || colspan=7 | Suspended (Inclement weather, Continuation May 27)|-style="background:#fbb;"
| 47 || May 27 || @ Nationals || 3–5 || Voth (1–0) || Hoffman (3–4) || Hand (8) || 7,343 || 21–26 || L1
|-style="background:#bfb;" 
| 48 || May 27 || @ Nationals || 3–0  || Gray (1–3) || Strasburg (1–2) || Sims (3) || 9,020 || 22–26 || W1
|-style="background:#fbb;" 
| 49 || May 28 || @ Cubs || 0–1 || Alzolay (3–4) || Gutiérrez (0–1) || Kimbrel (12) || 18,478 || 22–27 || L1
|-style="background:#fbb;" 
| 50 || May 29 || @ Cubs || 2–10 || Thompson (3–1) || Castillo (1–8) || — || 24,275 || 22–28 || L2
|-style="background:#bfb;" 
| 51 || May 30 || @ Cubs || 5–1 || Mahle (4–2) || Arrieta (5–5) || Antone (3) || 24,824 || 23–28 || W1
|-style="background:#bfb;" 
| 52 || May 31 || Phillies || 11–1 || Miley (5–4) || Velasquez (2–1) || — || 17,878 || 24–28 || W2
|-

|-style="background:#fbb;" 
| 53 || June 1 || Phillies || 3–17 || Nola (4–4) || Gray (1–4) || — || 10,788 || 24–29 || L1
|-style="background:#bbb;" 
| -- || June 2 || Phillies || colspan=7 | Postponed (make-up date June 28)
|-style="background:#bfb;" 
| 54 || June 3 || @ Cardinals || 4–2 || Gutiérrez (1–1) || Wainwright (3–5) || Sims (4) || 15,327 || 25–29 || W1
|-style="background:#bfb;" 
| 55 || June 4 || @ Cardinals || 6–4 || Castillo (2–8) || Kim (1–4) || Feliz (1) || 22,756 || 26–29 || W2
|-style="background:#bfb;" 
| 56 || June 5 || @ Cardinals || 5–2 || Mahle (5–2) || Helsley (3–4) || Sims (5) || 23,365 || 27–29 || W3
|-style="background:#bfb;" 
| 57 || June 6 || @ Cardinals || 8–7 || Hembree (1–1) || Reyes (3–2) || Sims (6) || 21,152 || 28–29 || W4
|-style="background:#fbb;" 
| 58 || June 8 || Brewers || 1–5 || Houser (4–5) || Hendrix (2–1) || — || 11,897 || 28–30 || L1
|-style="background:#bfb;" 
| 59 || June 9 || Brewers || 7–3 || Gutiérrez (2–1) || Anderson (2–4) || — || 11,862 || 29–30 || W1
|-style="background:#fbb;" 
| 60 || June 10 || Brewers || 2–7 || Suter (7–3) || Castillo (2–9) || — || 12,423 || 29–31 || L1
|-style="background:#bfb;" 
| 61 || June 11 || Rockies || 11–5 || Mahle (6–2) || Freeland (0–2) || — || 20,505 || 30–31 || W1
|-style="background:#bfb;" 
| 62 || June 12 || Rockies || 10–3 || Miley (6–4) || Márquez (4–6) || — || 23,765 || 31–31 || W2
|-style="background:#bfb;" 
| 63 || June 13 || Rockies || 6–2 || Hendrix (3–1) || Senzatela (2–7) || — || 18,268 || 32–31 || W3
|-style="background:#bfb;" 
| 64 || June 14 || @ Brewers || 10–2 || Gutiérrez (3–1) || Lauer (1–3) || — || 17,127 || 33–31 || W4
|-style="background:#bfb;" 
| 65 || June 15 || @ Brewers || 2–1  || Sims (4–1) || Boxberger (2–2) || Garrett (3) || 16,584 || 34–31 || W5
|-style="background:#bfb;" 
| 66 || June 16 || @ Brewers || 2–1 || Mahle (7–2) || Peralta (6–2) || Sims (7) || 20,088 || 35–31 || W6
|-style="background:#fbb;" 
| 67 || June 17 || @ Padres || 4–6 || Johnson (2–2) || Garrett (0–2) || — || 40,362 || 35–32 || L1
|-style="background:#fbb;" 
| 68 || June 18 || @ Padres || 2–8 || Paddack (4–5) || Santillan (0–1) || — || 33,456 || 35–33 || L2
|-style="background:#fbb;" 
| 69 || June 19 || @ Padres || 5–7 || Crismatt (2–1) || Hembree (1–2) || Melancon (20) || 38,765 || 35–34 || L3
|-style="background:#fbb;" 
| 70 || June 20 || @ Padres || 2–3 || Lamet (2–2) || Castillo (2–10) || Melancon (21) || 38,004 || 35–35 || L4
|-style="background:#fbb;" 
| 71 || June 21 || @ Twins || 5–7  || Shoemaker (3–8) || Hembree (1–3) || — || 17,530 || 35–36 || L5
|-style="background:#bfb;" 
| 72 || June 22 || @ Twins || 10–7 || Antone (2–0) || Robles (3–4) || Garrett (4) || 19,187 || 36–36 || W1
|-style="background:#bfb;" 
| 73 || June 24 || Braves || 5–3 || Santillan (1–1) || Chavez (0–1) || Brach (1) || 23,941 || 37–36 || W2
|-style="background:#fbb;" 
| 74 || June 25 || Braves || 2–3 || Smyly (5–3) || Gutiérrez (3–2) || Smith (16) || 30,231 || 37–37 || L1
|-style="background:#bfb;" 
| 75 || June 26 || Braves || 4–1 || Castillo (3–10) || Anderson (5–4) || Garrett (5) || 34,671 || 38–37 || W1
|-style="background:#fbb;" 
| 76 || June 27 || Braves || 0–4 || Muller (1–1) || Mahle (7–3) || — || 21,696 || 38–38 || L1
|-style="background:#bfb;"
| 77 || June 28 || Phillies || 12–4 || Hembree (2–3) || Feliz (0–1) || — || 21,006 || 39–38 || W1
|-style="background:#fbb;"  
| 78 || June 29 || Padres || 4–5 || Pagán (4–0) || Santillan (1–1) || Melancon (25) || 16,332 || 39–39 || L1
|-style="background:#fbb;" 
| 79 || June 30 || Padres || 5–7  || Musgrove (5–6) || Gutiérrez (3–3) || Hill (1) || 12,084 || 39–40 || L2
|-

|-style="background:#bfb;" 
| 80 || July 1 || Padres || 5–4 || Warren (1–0) || Melancon (1–1) || — || 16,620 || 40–40 || W1
|-style="background:#bfb;" 
| 81 || July 2 || Cubs || 2–1 || Osich (1–0) || Mills (3–2) || Hembree (2) || 40,854 || 41–40 || W2
|-style="background:#bfb;" 
| 82 || July 3 || Cubs || 3–2 || Hendrix (4–1) || Alzolay (4–8) || Hembree (3) || 36,815 || 42–40 || W3
|-style="background:#bfb;" 
| 83 || July 4 || Cubs || 3–2 || Warren (2–0) || Winkler (1–1) || Garrett (6) || 29,340 || 43–40 || W4
|-style="background:#bfb;" 
| 84 || July 5 || @ Royals || 6–2 || Gutiérrez (4–3) || Minor (6–7) || — || 14,709 || 44–40 || W5
|-style="background:#fbb;" 
| 85 || July 6 || @ Royals || 6–7 || Lovelady (2–0) || Hembree (2–4) || — || 14,491 || 44–41 || L1
|-style="background:#bfb;"
| 86 || July 7 || @ Royals || 5–2 || Gray (2–4) || Barlow (2–3) || Hembree (4) || 11,457 || 45–41 || W1
|-style="background:#fbb;" 
| 87 || July 8 || @ Brewers || 3–5 || Williams (6–1) || Brach (0–1) || Hader (21) || 22,948 || 45–42 || L1
|-style="background:#bfb;" 
| 88 || July 9 || @ Brewers || 2–0 || Miley (7–4) || Lauer (3–4) || Hembree (5) || 24,844 || 46–42 || W1
|-style="background:#bfb;" 
| 89 || July 10 || @ Brewers || 4–3 || Osich (2–0) || Hader (3–1) || Hembree (6) || 32,034 || 47–42 || W2
|-style="background:#bfb;" 
| 90 || July 11 || @ Brewers || 3–1 || Hendrix (5–1) || Hader (3–2) || Osich (1) || 32,135 || 48–42 || W3
|- style="text-align:center; background:#bff;"
| ASG || July 13 || AL @ NL || 5–2 || Ohtani (1–0) || Burnes (0–1) || Hendriks (1) || 49,184 || 48–42 || N/A
|-style="background:#fbb;" 
| 91 || July 16 || Brewers || 6–11 || Suter (9–4) || Garrett (0–3) || — || 34,844 || 48–43 || L1
|-style="background:#fbb;" 
| 92 || July 17 || Brewers || 4–7  || Gustave (1–0) || Doolittle (3–1) || — || 37,204 || 48–44 || L2
|-style="background:#fbb;" 
| 93 || July 18 || Brewers || 0–8 || Burnes (5–4) || Gray (2–5) || — || 29,001 || 48–45 || L3
|-style="background:#fbb;" 
| 94 || July 19 || Mets || 11–15  || Banda (1–0) || García (0–1) || May (3) || 17,080 || 48–46 || L4
|-style="background:#bfb;" 
| 95 || July 20 || Mets || 4–3 || Miley (8–4) || Nogosek (0–1) || Garrett (7) || 19,096 || 49–46 || W1
|-style="background:#fbb;" 
| 96 || July 21 || Mets || 0–7 || Stroman (7–8) || Hoffman (3–5) || — || 19,896 || 49–47 || L1
|-style="background:#bfb;"
| 97 || July 23 || Cardinals || 6–5 || Brach (1–1) || Gallegos (5–3) || Hembree (7) || 30,605 || 50–47 || W1
|-style="background:#bfb;" 
| 98 || July 24 || Cardinals || 5–3 || Castillo (4–10) || Woodford (2–2) || Hembree (8) || 33,489 || 51–47 || W2
|-style="background:#fbb;" 
| 99 || July 25 || Cardinals || 6–10 || Helsley (5–4) || Gray (2–6) || — || 21,947 || 51–48 || L1
|-style="background:#fbb;"
| 100 || July 26 || @ Cubs || 5–6 || Kimbrel (2–3) || Hembree (2–5) || — || 29,215 || 51–49 || L2
|-style="background:#bfb;"
| 101 || July 27 || @ Cubs || 7–4 || Gutiérrez (5–3) || Alzolay (4–11) || — || 28,153 || 52–49 || W1
|-style="background:#bfb;"
| 102 || July 28 || @ Cubs || 8–2 || Mahle (8–3) || Davies (6–7) || — || 30,134 || 53–49 || W2
|-style="background:#bfb;"
| 103 || July 29 || @ Cubs || 7–4 || Castillo (5–10) || Mills (4–4) || — || 32,793 || 54–49 || W3
|-style="background:#bfb;" 
| 104 || July 30 || @ Mets || 6–2 || Gray (3–6) || Castro (2–3) || — || 31,787 || 55–49 || W4
|-style="background:#fbb;"
| 105 || July 31 || @ Mets || 4–5  || Díaz (4–4) || Cessa (3–2) || — || 26,477 || 55–50 || L1
|-

|-style="background:#bfb;" 
| 106 || August 1 || @ Mets || 7–1 || Gutiérrez (6–3) || Stroman (7–10) || — || 23,443 || 56–50 || W1
|-style="background:#fbb;"
| 107 || August 3 || Twins || 5–7 || Coulombe (2–1) || Hembree (2–6) || Colomé (3) || 18,396 || 56–51 || L1
|-style="background:#bfb;" 
| 108 || August 4 || Twins || 6–5 || Castillo (6–10) || Barnes (0–2) || Lorenzen (1) || 16,828 || 57–51 || W1
|-style="background:#bfb;" 
| 109 || August 5 || Pirates || 7–4 || Gray (4–6) || Crowe (3–6) || Givens (1) || 19,393 || 58–51 || W2
|-style="background:#bfb;" 
| 110 || August 6 || Pirates || 10–0 || Miley (9–4) || Brubaker (4–11) || — || 27,804 || 59–51 || W3
|-style="background:#bfb;" 
| 111 || August 7 || Pirates || 11–3 || Gutiérrez (7–3) || Keller (3–9) || — || 31,297 || 60–51 || W4
|-style="background:#bfb;" 
| 112 || August 8 || Pirates || 3–2 || Mahle (9–3) || Wilson (2–5) || Givens (2) || 23,740 || 61–51 || W5
|-style="background:#fbb;" 
| 113 || August 9 || @ Indians || 3–9 || Garza (2–0) || Castillo (6–11) || — || 10,708 || 61–52 || L1
|-style="background:#fbb;" 
| 114 || August 10 || @ Braves || 2–3 || Smyly (8–3) || Hembree (2–7) || Smith (23) || 24,432 || 61–53 || L2
|-style="background:#fbb;" 
| 115 || August 11 || @ Braves || 6–8  || Santana (3–0) || Sims (4–2) || — || 23,375 || 61–54 || L3
|-style="background:#bfb; 
| 116 || August 12 || @ Braves || 12–3 || Gutiérrez (8–3) || Muller (2–4) || — || 23,395 || 62–54 || W1
|-style="background:#bfb;"
| 117 || August 13 || @ Phillies || 6–1 || Mahle (10–3) || Wheeler (10–7) || — || 26,074 || 63–54 || W2
|-style="background:#fbb;" 
| 118 || August 14 || @ Phillies || 1–6 || Moore (2–3) || Castillo (6–12) || — || 25,100 || 63–55 || L1
|-style="background:#bfb;" 
| 119 || August 15 || @ Phillies || 7–4 || Sims (5–2) || Nola (7–7) || Givens (3) || 28,544 || 64–55 || W1
|-style="background:#bfb;" 
| 120 || August 16 || Cubs || 14–5 || Miley (10–4) || Steele (2–2) || — || 15,404 || 65–55 || W2
|-style="background:#fbb;" 
| 121 || August 17 || Cubs || 1–2 || Hendricks (14–5) || Gutiérrez (8–4) || Heuer (1) || 13,989 || 65–56 || L1
|-style="background:#fbb;" 
| 122 || August 18 || Cubs || 1–7 || Rodríguez (1–2) || Mahle (10–4) || — || 16,922 || 65–57 || L2
|-style="background:#bfb;" 
| 123 || August 19 || Marlins || 6–1 || Castillo (7–12) || Neidert (1–2) || — || 11,581 || 66–57 || W1
|-style="background:#bfb;" 
| 124 || August 20 || Marlins || 5–3 || Gray (5–6) || Hernández (0–1) || Givens (4) || 19,106 || 67–57 || W2
|-style="background:#bfb;" 
| 125 || August 21 || Marlins || 7–4 || Cessa (4–2) || Bender (2–2) || Lorenzen (2) || 34,443 || 68–57 || W3
|-style="background:#bfb;" 
| 126 || August 22 || Marlins || 3–1 || Gutiérrez (9–4) || Alcántara (7–12) || Lorenzen (3) || 17,797 || 69–57 || W4
|-style="background:#fbb;" 
| 127 || August 24 || @ Brewers || 4–7 || Strickland (3–1) || Lorenzen (0–1) || Hader (27) || 24,819 || 69–58 || L1
|-style="background:#fbb;" 
| 128 || August 25 || @ Brewers || 1–4 || Woodruff (8–7) || Castillo (7–13) || — || 24,715 || 69–59 || L2
|-style="background:#bfb;" 
| 129 || August 26 || @ Brewers || 5–1 || Gray (6–6) || Anderson (4–8) || — || 28,656 || 70–59 || W1
|-style="background:#bfb;"
| 130 || August 27 || @ Marlins || 6–0 || Miley (11–4) || Thompson (2–6) || — || 7,119 || 71–59 || W2
|-style="background:#fbb;" 
| 131 || August 28 || @ Marlins || 1–6 || Alcántara (8–12) || Gutiérrez (9–5) || — || 10,407 || 71–60 || L1
|-style="background:#fbb;" 
| 132 || August 29 || @ Marlins || 1–2 || Luzardo (5–7) || Mahle (10–5) || Floro (7) || 11,019 || 71–61 || L2
|-style="background:#fbb;" 
| 133 || August 30 || Cardinals || 1–3 || Lester (5–6) || Castillo (7–14) || Gallegos (3) || 10,773 || 71–62 || L3
|-style="background:#bbb;" 
| — || August 31 || Cardinals || colspan=7 | Postponed (make-up date September 1)
|-

|-style="background:#fbb;" 
| 134 || September 1  || Cardinals || 4–5  || Cabrera (3–5) || Miley (11–5) || Gallegos (4) || 10,365 || 71–63 || L4
|-style="background:#bfb;" 
| 135 || September 1  || Cardinals || 12–2  || Gray (7–6) || Happ (8–7) || — || 10,892 || 72–63 || W1
|-style="background:#fbb;" 
| 136 || September 3 || Tigers || 5–15 || Holland (3–2) || Gutiérrez (9–6) || — || 19,430 || 72–64 || L1
|-style="background:#bfb;" 
| 137 || September 4 || Tigers || 7–4 || Mahle (11–5) || Boyd (3–8) || Givens (5) || 26,962 || 73–64 || W1
|-style="background:#fbb;" 
| 138 || September 5 || Tigers || 1–4 || Ureña (3–8) || Castillo (7–15) || Soto (18) || 23,083 || 73–65 || L1
|-style="background:#fbb;" 
| 139 || September 6 || @ Cubs || 3–4 || Effross (2–0) || Lorenzen (0–2) || Morgan (2) || 27,289 || 73–66 || L2
|-style="background:#bfb;" 
| 140 || September 7 || @ Cubs || 4–3 || Miley (12–5) || Sampson (0–2) || Givens (6) || 24,925 || 74–66 || W1
|-style="background:#fbb;" 
| 141 || September 8 || @ Cubs || 1–4  || Heuer (7–2) || Brach (1–2) || — || 25,861 || 74–67 || L1
|-style="background:#bfb;" 
| 142 || September 10 || @ Cardinals || 4–2 || Lorenzen (1–2) || McFarland (3–1) || Givens (7) || 29,597 || 75–67 || W1
|-style="background:#fbb;" 
| 143 || September 11 || @ Cardinals || 4–6 || Reyes (7–8) || Sims (5–3) || Gallegos (7) || 33,404 || 75–68 || L1
|-style="background:#fbb;" 
| 144 || September 12 || @ Cardinals || 0–2 || Happ (9–8) || Gray (7–7) || Gallegos (8) || 32,872 || 75–69 || L2
|-style="background:#fbb;" 
| 145 || September 14 || @ Pirates || 5–6 || Peters (1–2) || Miley (12–6) || Stratton (5) || 8,896 || 75–70 || L3
|-style="background:#fbb;" 
| 146 || September 15 || @ Pirates || 4–5 || Stratton (6–1) || Givens (3–3) || — || 9,320 || 75–71 || L4
|-style="background:#bfb;" 
| 147 || September 16 || @ Pirates || 1–0 || Mahle (12–5) || Ponce (0–4) || Givens (8) || 9,102 || 76–71 || W1
|-style="background:#bfb;" 
| 148 || September 17 || Dodgers || 3–1 || Castillo (8–15) || Buehler (14–4) || Lorenzen (4) || 28,926 || 77–71 || W2
|-style="background:#fbb;" 
| 149 || September 18 || Dodgers || 1–5 || Scherzer (15–4) || Gray (7–8) || Jansen (34) || 29,861 || 77–72 || L1
|-style="background:#fbb;" 
| 150 || September 19 || Dodgers || 5–8 || Kershaw (10–7) || Miley (12–7) || — || 26,621 || 77–73 || L2
|-style="background:#bfb;" 
| 151 || September 20 || Pirates || 9–5 || Cessa (5–2) || Ponce (0–5) || — || 17,086 || 78–73 || W1
|-style="background:#fbb;" 
| 152 || September 21 || Pirates || 2–6 || Keller (5–11) || Mahle (12–6) || — || 9,475 || 78–74 || L1
|-style="background:#bbb;" 
| — || September 22 || Pirates || colspan=7 | Postponed (rain, makeup September 27)''
|-style="background:#fbb;" 
| 153 || September 23 || Nationals || 2–3 || Corbin (9–15) || Castillo (8–16) || Finnegan (11) || 11,836 || 78–75 || L2
|-style="background:#bfb;" 
| 154 || September 24 || Nationals || 8–7  || Warren (3–0) || Thompson (1–2) || — || 16,021 || 79–75 || W1
|-style="background:#bfb;" 
| 155 || September 25 || Nationals || 7–6 || Givens (4–3) || Murphy (0–3) || — || 18,293 || 80–75 || W2
|-style="background:#bfb;" 
| 156 || September 26 || Nationals || 9–2 || Mahle (13–6) || Rogers (2–1) || — || 21,328 || 81–75 || W3
|-style="background:#bfb;" 
| 157 || September 27 || Pirates || 13–1 || Sanmartín (1–0) || Overton (0–1) || — || 11,055 || 82–75 || W4
|-style="background:#fbb;" 
| 158 || September 28 || @ White Sox || 1–7 || López (4–3) || O'Brien (0–1) || — || 25,242 || 82–76 || L1
|-style="background:#fbb;" 
| 159 || September 29 || @ White Sox || 1–6 || Rodón (13–5) || Gray (7–9) || — || 23,018 || 82–77 || L2
|-style="background:#fbb;" 
| 160 || October 1 || @ Pirates || 2–9 || Stratton (7–1) || Garrett (0–4) || — || 13,582 || 82–78 || L3
|-style="background:#fbb;"
| 161 || October 2 || @ Pirates || 6–8 || Mears (1–0) || Santillan (1–3) || Stratton (8) || 22,910 || 82–79 || L4
|-style="background:#bfb;" 
| 162 || October 3 || @ Pirates || 6–3 || Sanmartin (2–0) || Ponce (0–6) || — || 13,011 || 83–79 || W1

|- style="text-align:center;"
! colspan=9 | Legend:       = Win       = Loss       = PostponementBold = Reds team member
|}

Roster

Farm system

References

External links
Cincinnati Reds 2021 schedule at MLB.com
2021 Cincinnati Reds season at Baseball Reference

2021
2021 Major League Baseball season
2021 in sports in Ohio